The Mount Sinai Health System is a hospital network in New York City. It was formed in September 2013 by merging the operations of Continuum Health Partners and the Mount Sinai Medical Center.

The Health System is structured around eight hospital campuses, the Icahn School of Medicine at Mount Sinai and Phillips School of Nursing at Mount Sinai Beth Israel. The eight hospitals are: Mount Sinai Beth Israel, Mount Sinai Brooklyn, Mount Sinai Hospital (including Kravis Children's Hospital), Mount Sinai Queens, Mount Sinai Morningside (formerly Mount Sinai St. Luke's), Mount Sinai West (formerly Mount Sinai Roosevelt), New York Eye and Ear Infirmary of Mount Sinai, and Mount Sinai South Nassau.

The Health System includes more than 6,600 primary and specialty care physicians and 13 ambulatory surgical centers. It has ambulatory practices throughout the five boroughs of New York City, Westchester County, and Long Island, along with more than 30 affiliated community health centers.

In the 2017-2018 fiscal year, the Health System employed more than 39,000 people and the Icahn School of Medicine at Mount Sinai had 33 multidisciplinary research, educational, and clinical institutes. In addition, the Health System reported 3,360 beds among its seven hospitals as well as 136,528 inpatient admissions, 500,901 Emergency Department visits, and more than 14,700 babies delivered.

History
The Mount Sinai Health System began as a single hospital, founded in 1852 and opened in 1855 as The Jews' Hospital. In 1864, the hospital became formally nonsectarian and in 1866 changed its name to The Mount Sinai Hospital. The hospital is one of the oldest and largest teaching hospitals in the U.S. The hospital campus is located on the Upper East Side of Manhattan, beside Central Park.

Educational expansion
In 1881, the Mount Sinai Hospital established a training school for doctors and nurses. Prior to its establishment the hospital had been served by untrained male and female attendants. The school closed in September 1971 amid financial difficulties and a failed plan to affiliate with the City College of New York. The charter was taken up by The Mount Sinai Hospital School of Continuing Education in Nursing, founded in the fall of 1975.

In 1963 The Mount Sinai Hospital chartered The Mount Sinai School of Medicine, the first medical school to grow out of a non-university in more than 50 years. The school opened to students in 1968 and in 2012 changed its name to Icahn School of Medicine at Mount Sinai. The school and the hospital together formed the Mount Sinai Health Center.

In 2013, Phillips School of Nursing at Mount Sinai Beth Israel, founded in 1902, became the nursing school of the Mount Sinai Health System.

In 2016, the Mount Sinai Health System announced a partnership with Stony Brook Medicine, allowing for joint programs between the Icahn School of Medicine at Mount Sinai and the Renaissance School of Medicine at Stony Brook University.

Mount Sinai Queens

In 1993, Astoria General Hospital located on 30th Avenue in Astoria, Queens, became an affiliate of The Mount Sinai Hospital. A year later the hospital's name changed to Western Queens Community Hospital. In 1999, the hospital was purchased by Mount Sinai and had its name changed again, this time to Mount Sinai Queens, becoming the first community hospital to bear the Mount Sinai name.

Continuum Health Partners

On January 9, 1997, St. Luke's-Roosevelt entered into a partnership with Beth Israel Medical Center forming the Greater Metropolitan Health Systems, Inc. In April 1998, Greater Metropolitan Health Systems, Inc. was renamed Continuum Health Partners. The entity served as a parent corporation while the two hospital centers continued as separate business entities with their own constituent hospital campuses.

The New York Eye and Ear Infirmary, located on Second Avenue and 14th Street in Manhattan joined Continuum in 2000.

With a total combined annual operating budget of $2.1 billion, Continuum hospitals delivered inpatient care through nearly 3,100 certified beds located in seven major facilities in Manhattan and Brooklyn, while providing outpatient care in private practice settings and ambulatory centers. Continuum treated patients in Brooklyn, Manhattan and Westchester County.

Contract dispute with Aetna
In April 2010, Aetna notified policyholders that it was in a contract dispute with Continuum Health Partners and that the contract would lapse as of June 5, 2010.  The June 5 date passed and the contract lapsed. Continuum Health Partners provided subscribers with a form to request that Aetna retain their physicians for one year or until the policy period ended. On July 28, 2010, Continuum Health Partners announced a new agreement with Aetna. Within this agreement, it was noted that the effective date would be retroactive to the April 5, 2010, termination date.

Continuum and Mount Sinai merger
In September 2013, Continuum announced a merger with the Mount Sinai Medical Center. Brand unification was complete in January 2014.

Medicare audit and over-billing settlement
In May 2017, Mara Lee writing for Modern Healthcare reported in an article titled "Mount Sinai asked to return $41.9 million in Medicare overpayments" that issues of improper billing were being attributed to Mount Sinai by government health care officials. At the time, Mount Sinai officials admitted to partial misconduct and offered to cover limited billing claims retroactively.

HIPAA medical records settlement
In 2017, Mount Sinai West entered into settlement concerning the improper disclosure of patient medical records which was settled as the payment of a levied fine of approximately half-a-million dollars as reported in the medical journal Becker Hospital Review stating: "New York City-based St. Luke's-Roosevelt Hospital Center (Mount Sinai West) will pay $387,200 and implement a corrective action plan as part of a HIPAA settlement to resolve allegations it inappropriately handled a patient's sensitive health information."

2019 Discrimination lawsuit
In April 2019, Mount Sinai was named as a defendant in a lawsuit filed by discrimination lawyer Ann Olivarius on behalf of eight current and former employees for age and sex discrimination at its Arnhold Institute for Global Health at the Icahn School of Medicine. Also named in the suit are Dr. Prabhjot Singh, Director of the institute, Dr. Dennis S. Charney, Dean of the Icahn School, David Berman, the institute's Chief of Staff, and Bruno Silva, Director of Design and Product Development at the institute.  Mount Sinai and the four named men are accused of allowing a range of illegal activities, including acting "abusive, dismissive and hostile" to and discriminating against women, especially older women; verbal abuse of women; lying to financial donors such as USAID; misallocating funds; giving preferential treatment and higher salaries to men; failing to obtain Institutional Review Board approval prior to conducting research in violation of federal guidelines; failing to comply with the Health Insurance Portability and Accountability Act or HIPAA.  The defendants' alleged actions included referring to female employees using derogatory terms, and aggressive screaming at said employees.  In May 2019, more than 150 students at the Icahn School signed a letter, addressed to the Board of Trustees, calling on Mount Sinai "to further investigate allegations of gender and age discrimination" as a result of the legal filing. In July 2019, Dr. Singh "said he is stepping down from his leadership role following [the] lawsuit alleging age and sex discrimination. But he will remain on the faculty in a new role." In August 2019, the plaintiffs filed an amended complaint alleging further allegations, including possible spoliation of evidence.

Advertising
In January 2016, Mount Sinai launched their first nationwide print and television advertising campaign focused on bringing awareness of their network of hospitals, ambulatory practices, community health centers, and affiliations beyond the state of New York. Mount Sinai has worked with the advertising agency DeVito/Verdi since 2003 and the firm created the latest national campaign.

In 2018, Mount Sinai again worked with DeVito/Verdi on a campaign to raise awareness about the clinical care and procedures available to New York residents. The health system also worked on a campaign with the United States Tennis Association focused on orthopedics and sports medicine.

In 2019, the health system launched a television advertising campaign linked with an offline Long Island Rail Road, Metro-North Railroad, and New York City Subway awareness during the 91st Academy Awards.

Health System Components

Member Hospitals, Medical School & Nursing School

Hospital Affiliates

Nursing Home and Long Term Care Facility Affiliates
Archcare at Terence Cardinal Cooke Health Care Center
James J. Peters VA Medical Center Home
Jewish Home Lifecare (Bronx)
Jewish Home Lifecare (Manhattan)

Additional Components
Mount Sinai Health Network owned physician practices
Mount Sinai Health Network affiliated physician practices
Mount Sinai Doctors faculty practice (urgent care and outpatient practices)

References

External links
 Mount Sinai Health System Official website
 January 2014 press release unveling brand unification

 
Healthcare in New York City
Hospital networks in the United States
Organizations established in 1997
For more info Basichealthunit.com